Hypusine is an uncommon amino acid found in all eukaryotes and in some archaea, but not in bacteria. The only known proteins containing the hypusine residue is eukaryotic translation initiation factor 5A (eIF-5A) and a similar protein found in archaea. In humans, two isoforms of eIF-5A have been described: eIF5A-1 and eIF5A-2. They are encoded by two distinct genes EIF5A and EIF5A2. The protein is involved in protein biosynthesis and promotes the formation of the first peptide bond. The region surrounding the hypusine residue is highly conserved and is essential to the function of eIF5A.  Thus, hypusine and eIF-5A appear to be vital for the viability and proliferation of eukaryotic cells.

Hypusine is formed in eIF-5A by post-translational modification of one of the lysyl residues. Two reactions and two enzymes are involved:
1. Deoxyhypusine synthase catalyzes the cleavage of the polyamine spermidine and transfer of its 4-aminobutyl moiety to the ε-amino group of one specific lysine residue of the eIF-5A precursor to form deoxyhypusine and 1,3-diaminopropane.
2. Deoxyhypusine hydroxylase mediates the formation of hypusine by addition of a hydroxyl group to the deoxyhypusine residue.

An excess of hypusine was found in the urine of children and patients with familial hyperlysinemia.

Hypusine was first isolated from bovine brain by Japanese scientists Shiba et al. in 1971. The name hypusine indicates that the molecule comprises moieties of hydroxyputrescine and lysine.

See also
 n-Butylamine, related to 4-aminobutyl group of deoxyhypusine
 Putrescine
 Diphthamide, another translation-related uncommon amino acid
 EEF2, eukaryotic elongation factor 2, utilizing diphthamide

References

Amino acids
Non-proteinogenic amino acids